Ženski nogometni klub Mura or simply ŽNK Mura is a Slovenian women's football club based in Murska Sobota that competes in the 1. SŽNL, the top division of Slovenian women's football. The club is the most successful women's football club in Slovenia with nine 1. SŽNL championships and nine Slovenian Cup titles.

The club was founded in 1999 as ŽNK Odranci, and was known as ŽNK Pomurje between 2003 and 2022. In January 2023, the club merged with the men's football club NŠ Mura and renamed as ŽNK Mura.

History

Founded in 1999 as ŽNK Odranci, the club won its first Slovenian Cup title in 2005 and the Slovenian League championship the following year, competing under the name ŽNK Pomurje. The next season, Pomurje won its second cup and was the league's runner-up. In 2008 and 2009, Pomurje was second to ŽNK Krka both in the league and the cup, but declined in the next two seasons (third in 2010 and fifth in 2011).

However, in 2012, Pomurje won both the league title and the cup, attaining their first double. The club became a dominating force between 2012 and 2016, winning four doubles and five straight championships. In the 2018–19 season, Pomurje won a seventh championship title without dropping any points, winning all 21 games of the season.

In the 2014–15 UEFA Women's Champions League season, Pomurje advanced to the round of 32 for the first time by finishing as the best runner-up in the qualifying tournament.

In December 2022, ŽNK Pomurje announced its merger with the men's football club NŠ Mura. The process was completed in January 2023, when the club adopted the new name ŽNK Mura, and also changed its colours to black and white.

Current squad

Honours
Slovenian League
 Winners (9): 2005–06, 2011–12, 2012–13, 2013–14, 2014–15, 2015–16, 2018–19, 2020–21, 2021–22

Slovenian Cup
 Winners (9): 2004–05, 2006–07, 2011–12, 2012–13, 2013–14, 2015–16, 2016–17, 2017–18, 2018–19The Double (League and Cup)
 Winners (5):' 2011–12, 2012–13, 2013–14, 2015–16, 2018–19

Record in UEFA competitionsMura goals always listed first.''

References

External links
Official website 
Soccerway profile
UEFA profile

Association football clubs established in 1999
Women's football clubs in Slovenia
1999 establishments in Slovenia